Red button may refer to:

Red Button (digital television), a button on the remote control for certain digital television set top boxes in the United Kingdom and Australia, and used to access interactive television services
BBC Red Button, a digital interactive television service in the United Kingdom
Red Buttons (1919–2006), the stage name of American comedian and actor Aaron Chwatt
The Red Button, an American pop band consisting of Seth Swirsky and Mike Ruekberg
Red Button, an enemy of Doga, a superhero character appearing in Raj Comics, India

See also
Kill switch, also called big red button or big red switch, an emergency shut-off mechanism for machinery, also used symbolically in works of fiction as a means to activate a destructive device